The Istaby Runestone, listed in the Rundata catalog as DR 359, is a runestone with an inscription in Proto-Norse which was raised in  Istaby, Blekinge, Sweden, during the Vendel era (c. 550-790).

Inscription

Transliteration into Latin characters
AP 
AQ 
B

Transcription into Proto-Norse
AP 
AQ 
B

English translation
AP In memory of Hariwulfar. Haþuwulfar, Heruwulfar's son, 
AQ Haþuwulf(a)r, Heruwulfar's son, in memory of Hariwulfar 
B wrote these runes.

Interpretation
The Istaby, Stentoften Runestone and Gummarp Runestone inscriptions can be identified with the same clan through the names that are mentioned on them. The names have alliterative first name element combined with a lycophoric second element that represent an aristocratic naming tradition common among chieftains. The Björketorp Runestone lacks names and is raised some tens of kilometers from the others. However, it is beyond doubt that the Björketorp runestone is connected to them, because in addition to the special runic forms, the same message is given on the Stentoften Runestone. Of these, on stylistics grounds, the Istaby runestone may be the oldest.

The name Hariwulfa is a combination of hari meaning "warrior" and wulafa "wolf," while the haþu of Haþuwulfz means "battle" and the heru of Heruwulfar, when combined in personal names, means "sword." The latter name also has a suffix indicating paternal descent, so the name Heruwulfar in full means "of the family of Sword-Wolf." A shortened form of the name Hariwulfa survived into the Viking Age and is attested in the inscription on the Hærulf Runestone. It has been suggested that the assignment of such lycophoric names is related to ritualistic practices and religious wolf-symbolism used in the initiation of young warriors.

The Istaby runestone is currently located at the Swedish Museum of National Antiquities in Stockholm. The stone has a Danish Rundata catalog number as Blekinge was part of the historic Denmark.

See also
List of runestones

References

Sources

Jacobsen, Lis & Moltke, Erik: Danmarks Runeindskrifter. 3rd tome. 1941.

External links
Photograph of stone in 1999 - Swedish National Heritage Board

6th-century inscriptions
7th-century inscriptions
8th-century inscriptions
Haþuwulf's runestones
Proto-Norse language
Runestones in Blekinge
Elder Futhark inscriptions